Caroline Knox (born 1938) is an American poet based in Massachusetts. She is the author of six collections of poetry, most recently, Quaker Guns (Wave Books, 2008), and Nine Worthies (Wave Books, 2010). Her poems have been published in literary journals and magazines including American Scholar, Boston Review, Harvard, Massachusetts Review, New Republic, Paris Review, Ploughshares, Poetry, TriQuarterly, The Times Literary Supplement, and Yale Review. Her poems have also been included in Best American Poetry (1988 and 1994). Her honors include fellowships from the National Endowment for the Arts, the Ingram Merrill Foundation, the Massachusetts Cultural Council, The Fund for Poetry, and the Yale/Mellon Visiting Faculty Program. Knox earned her A.B. from Radcliffe College and her M.A. and Ph.D. from University of Wisconsin–Milwaukee.

Bibliography
 Hear Trains (Wave Books, forthcoming 2019)
 To Drink Boiled Snow (Wave Books, 2015)
 Flemish (Wave Books, 2013)
 Nine Worthies (Wave Books, 2010)
 Quaker Guns (Wave Books, 2008)
 He Paves the Road with Iron Bars (Verse Press, 2004)
 A Beaker: New and Selected Poems (Verse Press, 2002)
 Sleepers Wake (Timken Publishers, 1994)
 To Newfoundland (University of Georgia Press, 1989)
 The House Party (University of Georgia Press, 1984)

Honors and awards
 2006 Massachusetts Cultural Council
 2005 Maurice English Poetry Award (for He Paves the Road with Iron Bars)
 1996 Massachusetts Cultural Council
 1986 National Endowment for the Arts Fellowship

References

External links
 Author Page: Caroline Knox > Wave Books
 Review: Bookslut > May 2008 > Review by Josh Cook of Quaker Guns by Caroline Knox
 Interview: Jubilat > Interview with Caroline Knox
 Poem: Academy of American Poets > His Heart by Caroline Knox
 Poem: Boston Review > Jan/Feb 2006 > My Husband Sat Up by Caroline Knox

Living people
Radcliffe College alumni
Poets from Massachusetts
National Endowment for the Arts Fellows
University of Wisconsin–Milwaukee alumni
American women poets
21st-century American women
1938 births